Margaret and George Riley Jones House, also known as the Riley-Jones Club, Inc., is a historic home located at Muncie, Delaware County, Indiana. It was built in 1901, and is a -story, "L"-plan, Colonial Revival style frame dwelling sheathed in brick. It features a gable roof with dormers, arched windows, and full-width front porch with mosaic tile floor.  It housed a private women's club.  The club closed in 2003 and the building now houses law offices.

It was added to the National Register of Historic Places in 1984.

References

Houses on the National Register of Historic Places in Indiana
Colonial Revival architecture in Indiana
Houses completed in 1901
Houses in Muncie, Indiana
National Register of Historic Places in Muncie, Indiana
1901 establishments in Indiana